was a Japanese football player. He played for Japan national team.

Club career
Yamaji was born in Hyogo Prefecture on August 31, 1929. After graduating from Waseda University, he played for Sumitomo Metal. He also played for Osaka SC and won the 2nd place at Emperor's Cup 3 times (1951, 1952 and 1953).

National team career
In March 1954, Yamaji was selected Japan national team for 1954 World Cup qualification. At this qualification, on March 7, he debuted against South Korea.

National team statistics

References

External links
 
 Japan National Football Team Database

1929 births
2021 deaths
Waseda University alumni
Association football people from Hyōgo Prefecture
Japanese footballers
Japan international footballers
Kashima Antlers players
Association football defenders